The Pastel Journal is a bi-monthly magazine focused on pastel artists and pastel art. The magazine was started in 1999.

It is headquartered in Cincinnati. The magazine was published by F+W Media until 2019, when it was acquired by Macanta Investments and became part of the Peak Media Properties. As of 2006, its circulation was approximately 26,000.

References

External links
Official Website

1999 establishments in Ohio
Visual arts magazines published in the United States
Bimonthly magazines published in the United States
Magazines established in 1999
Magazines published in Cincinnati